Talquetamab is an experimental humanized monoclonal antibody being developed by Janssen Pharmaceuticals for the treatment of multiple myeloma.

Talquetamab is a bispecific antibody against two targets: human CD3, a T-cell surface antigen, and human G-protein coupled receptor family C group 5 member D (GPRC5D), a tumor-associated antigen with potential antineoplastic activity.  Talquetamab binds both targets, drawing the T cells close to the tumor cells, causing a cytotoxic T-lymphocyte response.

In the United States, Janssen received breakthrough therapy designation for talquetamab in June 2022 for the treatment of adult patients with relapsed or refractory multiple myeloma, who have previously received at least 4 prior lines of therapy, including a proteasome inhibitor, an immunomodulatory agent, and an anti-CD38 antibody. Janssen filed for approval from the Food and Drug Administration in December 2022 and from the European Medicines Agency in January 2023.

References 

Monoclonal antibodies
Experimental cancer drugs